Jacob Wackernagel  (11 December 1853 – 22 May 1938) was a Swiss linguist, Indo-Europeanist and scholar of Sanskrit. He was born in Basel, son of the philologist Wilhelm Wackernagel (1806–1869).

Biography
Jacob Wackernagel was born on 11 December 1853 in Basel to Wilhelm Wackernagel, a Professor of German Language and Literature in Basel, and his second wife, Maria Salome (nee Sarasin). He was named after his godfather, Jacob Grimm of the Brothers Grimm. Jacob's father died when he was sixteen.

Wackernagel studied classical and Germanic philology and history in Basel (1871-1872), Göttingen (1872-1874) and Leipzig (1874-1875); he started a doctorate in Basel in 1875, writing his thesis on "the beginnings of the study of 'pathology' (in a sense, a rudimentary study of speech sounds) in the Greek grammarians". He defended that thesis in 1876, among his examiners were Nietzsche and Heyne. Wackernagel then spent a short time studying at Oxford, and then began lecturing as Privatdozent in Basel in 1876-1877 winter semester. In 1879, at the age of 26, he became a successor of Friedrich Nietzsche as Professor of Greek.

He married Maria Stehlin, with whom he had eight children, in 1886. Two of their sons, Jakob and Hans Georg, became Basel professors.

In 1902 he was offered a chair of comparative philology in the University of Göttingen and was a Pro-Rector in 1912/13, but as a consequence of World War I he returned to Basel in 1915. In Basel he soon was appointed to the chair of linguistics and classical philology and held this position until his retirement in 1936. He taught for sixty years. In 1918-1919 he briefly became a Rector of the University; he held this position before in 1890. Wackernagel died on 22 May 1938 at home in Basel.

Work

Wackernagel's major work is the Altindische Grammatik, a comprehensive grammar of Sanskrit.

He is best known among modern linguists and philologists for formulating Wackernagel's law, concerning the placement of unstressed words (enclitic sentential particles) in syntactic second position in Indo-European clauses (Wackernagel 1892).

Another law named after him (Wackernagel 1889) is Wackernagel's law of lengthening (Dehnungsgesetz in German), also sometimes known as the law of lengthening in composition (Regelung der Dehnung in der Zusammensetzung): in some compound words in Greek the first component ends with a vowel and the second component begins with a vowel; when neither vowel is high the first vowel is without effect and the second is replaced by its long counterpart.

Lectures on Syntax 
Wackernagel read two courses in 1918-1919, while being a Rector, on "the elements of syntax with special reference to Greek, Latin and German". Lectures notes were taken by two of his students. "First series" of lectures were published in 1920, it contained themes of "number, voice, tense, mood, and the non-finite forms of the verb". The book was successful, and in 1924 the "second series" were published "on gender, nouns and adjectives, pronouns, the article, prepositions, and negation". Second edition was published in 1926 and 1928. The book was translated into English by David Langslow in 2009. Andreas Willi of the University of Oxford praised both Wackernagel's work and Langslow's translation, writing "A hallmark feature of Wackernagel's Lectures is their accessible style, which makes them easy to read from cover to cover. Langslow impressively succeeds in preserving this feature: while not being slavish, his translation is both accurate and idiomatic."

Bibliography

 Jacob Wackernagel, Altindische Grammatik
 Jacob Wackernagel, Lectures on Syntax: with special reference to Greek, Latin, and Germanic, edited and translated by David Langslow, New York: Oxford University Press, 2009  (original edition: 1920–1924).

Notes and references

External links
 Biography at Rutgers Database of Classical Scholars
 Bayerische Staatsbibliothek digital

1853 births
1938 deaths
People from Basel-Stadt
Linguists from Switzerland
Linguists of Germanic languages
Linguists of Indo-European languages
Sanskrit grammarians
Sanskrit scholars
Swiss Indologists
19th-century linguists
20th-century linguists
Members of the Royal Society of Sciences in Uppsala